In Hinduism, Daksha is a Prajapati, and the son of the creator god Brahma. Hindu literature identifies both Asikni and Prasuti as the name of Daksha's wife. Some of the notable daughters of Daksha include Aditi, the mother of the adityas, Diti, the mother of the daityas, Danu, the mother of the danavas, Svaha, the goddess of sacrifices and the wife of Agni, and Sati, the first wife of Shiva. 

Daksha's daughters have an important role in creation, as they were given in marriage by their father to a number of deities in Hindu mythology. In the Mahabharata, the sixteen daughters of Daksha become the mothers of all living beings, including the devas, the asuras, and humans.

List

Daughters of Prasuti 
The number of Prasuti's daughters from Daksha varies across the Puranas. The number of their daughters range from 16 to 60. Prasuti's daughters are regarded to represent the virtues of mind and the body. They are married to different deities. The Vishnu Purana states that Prasuti bore Daksha 24 daughters.

Daughters of Asikni 
According to the Padma Purana, when Daksha felt the number of women he had created were still not sufficient, he decided to have 60 more daughters from his wife, Asikni. Sati was the daughter married to Shiva. According to the Matsya Purana, not one of these daughters resembled their father. They are listed by their marriages to deities and sages:
 10 daughters married to Dharma
 13 daughters married to the sage Kashyapa
 27 daughters married to Chandra
 4 daughters married to Arishtanemi
 2 daughters married to the sons of the sage Bhrigu
 2 daughters married to the sage Angiras
 2 daughters married to Krisasva

Wives of Dharma 
The 10 daughters married to Dharma are:
 Maruvati
 Vasu
 Jami
 Lamba
 Bhanu
 Urjja
 Sankalpa
 Muhurta
 Sadhya
 Vishva

Wives of Kashyapa 
The 13 daughters married to the sage Kashyapa are:
 Aditi
 Diti
 Danu
 Arishta
 Surasa
 Surabhi
 Vinata
 Tamra
 Krodhavasha
 Ira
 Kadru
 Vishva
 Muni

Wives of Chandra 
The 27 daughters married to Chandra who became the nakshastras (lunar mansions) are:

 Ashvinī, 
 Bharanī,
 Kṛttikā
 Rohinī,
 Mrigashīra
 Ārdrā
 Punarvasu
 Pushya
 Ashlesha
 Maghā
 Pūrvaphalgunī
 Uttaraphalgunī
 Hasta
 Chitrā
 Svātī
 Vishākhā
 Anurādhā or Rādha
 Jyeshtha
 Mūla
 Pūrvashādhā
 Uttarashara
 Shravana or Abhijita
 Dhanistha
 Shatabhisha
 Pūrva Bhādrapadā
 Uttarbhadrapada
 Revatī

References

Daughters of Daksha
Hindu goddesses